Mario Zenari (born 5 January 1946) is an Italian prelate of the Catholic Church who has been a cardinal since 2016. He has served his entire ecclesiastical career in the diplomatic service of the Holy See, holding senior positions beginning in 1999. He has been Apostolic Nuncio to Syria since 30 December 2008. He was nuncio to Sri Lanka from 2004 to 2008.

Life
Mario Zenari was born in 1946 in Rosegaferro. He received his ordination to the priesthood on 5 July 1970 in Verona from Bishop Giuseppe Carraro.

To prepare for a diplomatic career he entered the Pontifical Ecclesiastical Academy in 1976.

On 7 February 1994, Pope John Paul II appointed him to several diplomatic positions as papal representative to non-governmental organizations in Vienna. And on 15 June he was given the title monsignor as a Prelate of Honour of His Holiness.

He was named Titular Archbishop of Iulium Carnicum and apostolic nuncio to Burkina Faso, Niger, and Cote d'Ivoire on 12 July 1999. He received his episcopal consecration on 25 September 1999 from Cardinal Angelo Sodano.

On 10 May 2004, he was named the nuncio to Sri Lanka. On 30 December 2008, Pope Benedict XVI appointed him nuncio to Syria where he was stationed during the Syrian Civil War that began in 2011.

Pope Francis on 9 October 2016 announced that he would make Zenari a cardinal in a papal consistory scheduled for 19 November 2016, citing his work for the "beloved and martyred Syria". He was made a Cardinal Deacon on that day and assigned to the church of Santa Maria delle Grazie alle Fornaci fuori Porta Cavalleggeri. Francis made him a member of the Congregation for the Oriental Churches on 23 December 2017.

See also
 List of heads of the diplomatic missions of the Holy See

References

External links

 
 
Catholic Hierarchy

1946 births
20th-century Italian Roman Catholic titular archbishops
21st-century Italian Roman Catholic titular archbishops
Apostolic Nuncios to Ivory Coast
Apostolic Nuncios to Burkina Faso
Apostolic Nuncios to Niger
Apostolic Nuncios to Sri Lanka
Apostolic Nuncios to Syria
Pontifical Ecclesiastical Academy alumni
Living people
Religious leaders from Verona
21st-century Italian cardinals
Cardinals created by Pope Francis